The  is a railway line in Chiba Prefecture, Japan, operated by the private railway operator Keisei Electric Railway. It branches from the Keisei Main Line at Keisei Tsudanuma Station and connects to Chiba Chūō Station. At Chiba Chūō Station, the line is connected to the Chihara Line.

History
The entire line opened on 17 July 1921 as an electrified, dual-track,  gauge branch line.

Stations 
 All trains are local trains that stop at all stations.

Operation Pattern
The local train on the line stops at every station. In the daytime, Shin-Keisei through service trains from Keisei Tsudanuma to Chiharadai station and trains from Matsudo to Chiba-Chuo runs at 20 minute intervals. On the Keisei Chiba Line, trains operate with a 10 Minute interval.
All trains are 6 cars long maximum, due to the platform length restriction at the intermediate stops between Keisei Tsudanuma Station and Keisei Chiba Station. 
4 car trains are abolished due to a timetable revision on December 8, 2018.
There's also trains to and from Keisei Ueno Station that directs the main line in part of the morning and evening, but all sections are set only for normal stops at each station. In the morning, the up (keisei tsudanuma direction) is set at the same 10-minute interval as during the day, and the down (towards Chiba Chuo) is set every 6 to 10 minutes.
The direction curtain and destination display of the train to Chiharadai on the Chihara Line are "(Chiba) Chiharadai" (line breaks in front of Chiharadai), but LED display cars and Shin-Keisei Electric Railway vehicles are written as "Chiharadai".

References

This article incorporates material from the corresponding article in the Japanese Wikipedia.

Chiba Line
Railway lines in Chiba Prefecture